Leunisia is a genus of Chilean flowering plants in the family Asteraceae.

Species
There is only one known species, Leunisia laeta, native to the Coquimbo and Valparaíso Regions of Chile.

References

Monotypic Asteraceae genera
Nassauvieae
Endemic flora of Chile